Luc Provençal is a Canadian politician, who was elected to the National Assembly of Quebec in the 2018 provincial election. He represents the electoral district of Beauce-Nord as a member of the Coalition Avenir Québec.

Prior to his election to the legislature, Provençal was the mayor of Beauceville.

References

Living people
Coalition Avenir Québec MNAs
21st-century Canadian politicians
People from Chaudière-Appalaches
Mayors of places in Quebec
Year of birth missing (living people)